"The Village Song" is a poem by Sarojini Naidu about the mindset of two generations, represented by an old woman and her daughter.

References

Indian poems
1912 poems